Gonospira funiculus is a species of air-breathing land snail, terrestrial pulmonate gastropod mollusk in the family Streptaxidae.

Description
The length of the shell attains 12.5 mm.

Distribution
This species is endemic to Réunion.

References

 Pfeiffer, L., 1842 - Symbolae ad Historiam Heliceorum, vol. II, p. 147 pp
 Fischer-Piette, E., C. P. Blanc, F. Blanc, & F. Salvat (1994). Gastéropodes terrestres pulmonés. Faune de Madagascar, 83: 1-552

Gonospira
Taxonomy articles created by Polbot
Taxobox binomials not recognized by IUCN
Gastropods described in 1842